The Renault Fuego (Fire in Spanish) is a sport hatchback that was manufactured and marketed by Renault from 1980 to 1986, replacing the Renault 15 and 17 coupés of the 1970s.

Marketed in the United States by American Motors Corporation (AMC), the Fuego was also assembled in several countries in South America, where production continued until 1992. According to Renault, 265,367 Fuegos were produced, 85% of those manufactured in France from February 1980 to October 1985. Spanish production for European markets continued into 1986.

Design
The Fuego's exterior was styled by Michel Jardin, and the interior by Francois Lampreia, both working under direction of Robert Opron. Automotive journalist L. J. K. Setright said the Fuego "is blessed with a body which is not only roomy and aerodynamically efficient, but is also beautiful".

The Fuego was heavily based on the Renault 18, sharing its floorpan and drivetrain, with its front suspension developed from the larger Renault 20/30. Despite sharing no parts, the design kept the familiar double-wishbone layout common with the Renault 18, incorporating a negative scrub radius geometry. The suspension design would later be added to the facelifted Renault 18, and later, with minor refinements (larger bushings etcetera), the Renault 25. Power steering available at the higher end of the range. The Fuego dashboard was added to the facelifted R18 in 1984 (though initially only available in the R18 Turbo) and then both updated again in September 1983 (LHD cars only) for the 1984 model year. European production continued until 1985 in France and 1986 in Spain, while Renault Argentina produced the Fuego from 1982 until ending production in 1992 with the 2.2 L "GTA Max" (the final phase III facelift introduced in 1990). In Argentina, it reached 63% of local parts integration.

The Fuego was the first mass-produced four-seat sports model to be designed in a wind tunnel, resulting in a drag coefficient (Cd) factor ranging from 0.32 to 0.35.

The Fuego was the first car to have a remote keyless system with central locking, available from September 1982 using a system invented by Frenchman Paul Lipschutz  — marketed as the "PLIP" remote in Europe). The Fuego was also the first to have remote steering wheel-mounted controls for the audio system (European LHD GTX and Turbo from September 1983). This feature was subsequently popularised on the 1984 model Renault 25. The Fuego was also available with options including leather upholstery, multi-function trip computer, cruise control, air-conditioning (factory or dealer-installed), and a full-length Webasto electric fabric sunroof.

A convertible version trimmed with a leather interior was unveiled by the French coachbuilder Heuliez in 1982 aimed at the U.S. market, but wasn't produced due to lower than expected sales in the American market - the R11/Alliance convertible taking its place. Three examples were built and finished to American specification (sealed beam headlights, enlarged bumpers, etc.).

Marketing

Europe
The Fuego became the best selling coupé in Europe during 1980 through to 1982. Variants included: 1.4 L TL, 1.6 L economy tuned GTL (LHD only); 1.6 L TS and GTS (manual and automatic transmissions); 2.0 L TX and GTX (manual and automatic transmissions). The TX was a downgraded version of the GTX, but differences varied by country. This model deleted alloy wheels, electric windows, central locking, air conditioning, fog lights, headlight wipers, etc. depending upon the market. A manual-only 2.1 L turbo-diesel was also produced for LHD European markets in the 1982-1985 period. This model was differentiated by the "bulge" in the top of the bonnet, extra vents in the front bumper, and "Turbo D" badging on the grille, side and rear hatch glass.

The Fuego Turbo (1.6 L/1565cc with a manual transmission) was added in 1983 to coincide with the facelift. This facelift included a revised front grille, plastic trim on the bumpers, revised dashboard on LHD models, wheel design, interior trim and fabrics - sepia (coffee brown) with dark brown/white striped velour seats; or ash (grey) with black/red striped velour seats for the Turbo, and ash or sepia for the other models sold with European specifications. Interior colour now depended on exterior colour, eliminating the large choice of customised options of the previous models. The facelifted GTX was also offered with the 2.2 L EFI engine from the Renault 25 in certain LHD markets (generally where the Fuego Turbo was not sold).

United States
The Fuego was marketed in the United States through American Motors Corporation (AMC) dealers from 1982 to 1985 inclusive. It was offered with a fuel-injected 1.6 L turbocharged (1565cc) or normally aspirated version (1647cc) in 1982 and 1983; for 1984 and 1985 the car was offered with a 2.2 L engine with manual or automatic transmissions, plus the 1.6 L turbo version. The hatchback coupe could carry four passengers, and delivered  on the highway) at a base price of $8,495 at introduction. The model received generally good reviews. They also noted below average braking and understeer.

The Fuego did not achieve the sales to turn Renault's fortunes around in the United States. By 1984, AMC dealers were eligible for rebates of $300 and $1,000, respectively, on each model.

United Kingdom
Renault sold the Fuego in the UK aiming it at the market segment occupied by the Opel Manta and Ford Capri. It became the top-selling coupé during 1981 and 1982. The available trims beginning in 1980–81 with the TL, GTS, and GTX, before increasing to the TL, TS, GTS, GTS Automatic, TX, and GTX manual in 1981–82; TL, TS, GTS, GTS Automatic, TX, GTX, GTX Automatic in 1982–83; TL, GTS, TX, GTX Automatic, and Turbo in 1983–84, and down to just two (GTS and Turbo) during 1985 and 1986 as sales declined.

Australia

In Australia, the 2 L GTX manual was the main model from 1982 to 1987, fully specified with factory air conditioning, TRX alloy wheels, a passenger mirror with remote control, but no trip computer. There was also a limited run of the more basic TX models. The Australian specifications included side intrusions beams in the doors and emission controls to meet Australian Design Rules.

New Zealand
In New Zealand the UK specification GTS and GTX manuals were delivered from late 1981 into 1982; GTS, GTS Automatic, GTX, GTX Automatic in 1983; GTX, GTX Automatic, Turbo in 1984; GTX Automatic and Turbo in 1985; GTX (end of line Australian specification GTX's transferred from Australia), GTX Automatic, and Turbo in 1986.

Timeline
February 1980 - Introduction of the Fuego three-door coupé. The TL has a basic equipment level with 155 SRx13 tyres, heated rear window, rear fog light, split-fold rear seat, and cloth upholstery. The GTL adds 175/70x13 tyres, electric front windows, tachometer, height-adjustable steering wheel, front head restraints, analogue clock, wheel covers, remote-adjustable drivers door mirror, laminated windscreen, opening rear quarter windows, H4 headlights, pre-installed radio kit, and velour upholstery. The GTS adds an engine oil-level gauge, power-assisted steering, and an optional three-speed automatic transmission. 185/65xHR14 light alloy wheels are optional. 
1981 - Fuel reserve warning light standard on all models, the four- and five-speed manuals were modified and some had their ratios adjusted. Introduction of the TX and GTX with 1995 cc engine (rated at ) and five-speed manual gearbox. The TX has the same specification as the GTS, except for series mounted 14-inches wheels though equipped with steel rims rather than alloy , with the GTX gaining front fog lights, headlamp wash-wipe, 14-inch alloy wheels (185/65xHR14 tires), leather on the steering wheel rim, gear lever gate, and handbrake lever gate, as well as digital clock, optional passenger side door mirror, bronze tinted windows, luggage cover, and airhorn. The optional three-speed automatic transmission now available on the 2 L TX and GTX in addition to the 1.6 L, beginning in September 1981.
1982 - The GTL is upgraded to a five-speed gearbox, while the automatic switched from the 1.6 L to the torquier 2 L engine. The GTS gains electronic ignition. The GTS, TX (depending on the country), and GTX gain remote central locking. The 2.1 L turbo diesel is introduced to certain LHD European markets. The 1.6 L fuel-injected and turbo versions are introduced in the United States through Renault/American Motors dealers.
1983 - The GTL gains an economy tuned  version of the 1647 cc engine and a five-speed gearbox, while electronic ignition becomes standard across the range. The Fuego also becomes more aerodynamic, with small spoilers and deflectors as well as smooth hubcaps added.
1984 - The new 1984 model year facelift (From October 1983) involved consolidating the range but included adding the top of the range Turbo model to the European lineup. The facelift included a new grille, bumpers, wheel design, and interior trim (as well as a redesigned dashboard for LHD vehicles). A limited production run of turbos fitted with EFi produced for the Swiss market to meet their emission controls. A 2.2 L EFi version of the GTX is introduced to certain LHD markets. Models sold in the United States are equipped with either the 1.6 L turbo or 2.2 L engines (manual or automatic) and an updated interior.
1985 - Production of the Fuego ends in France, with the introduction of the Renault 21.
1986 - Production ends in Spain. Production lines transferred to Argentina and Venezuela.
1987 - Production continues in Argentina (where the only available engine is the 2165 cc producing ) and Venezuela.
1990 - The final phase III GTA is introduced with new bumpers, white front indicators, and charcoal tail-lights. The higher performance GTA Max is introduced in Argentina with a 2.2 L engine tuned by Berta Motorsport, producing .
1992 - South American production ends.

The Fuego was not directly replaced by another model in the Renault range. A Fuego II was planned, similarly styled as the new Renault Alpine GTA. However, the development of the new model was cancelled at the last minute due to a combination of Renault's financial problems along with the declining demand for sports coupés in the marketplace at that time.

References

External links

Fuego
Hatchbacks
Sport compact cars
Front-wheel-drive sports cars
Cars introduced in 1980
Cars of Argentina
Cars discontinued in 1992